Agave univittata, the thorn-crested century plant or thorn-crested agave, is a plant species native to coastal areas of southern Texas and northeastern Mexico, at elevations less than 100 m (300 feet). It has been widely named Agave lophantha by botanists including Howard Scott Gentry, but the name A. univittata is older and therefore more in accord with nomenclatural rules of botany.

Agave univittata has thick, fleshy leaves that are stiff and undulate (wavy) along the margins. It has sharp and prominent spines on the edges and tips of the leaves. Flowering stalk is up to 5 m (16 feet) tall, bearing greenish-white to yellow-ish green flowers.

It is cultivated as an ornamental plant, and in the UK the cultivar 'Quadricolor' has won the Royal Horticultural Society's Award of Garden Merit.

Because the species is widespread and the overall population is stable, it is not considered by the IUCN to be threatened.

References

External links

univittata
Flora of Northeastern Mexico
Flora of Texas
Flora of Tamaulipas